Regional Science High School for Region 1 (RSHS) is a Magnet school of the Department of Education (Philippines), established in 1994 by virtue of DECS Order No. 69,s.1993. The school has a curriculum that specializes in science and research (different from Special Science Program/Engineering and Science Education Program schools).

History
The school started with a single classroom consisting of 60 bright students coming from different provinces in the Ilocos Region, with Dr. Igmedio M. Cariaga as Principal. For almost four years, it shared classrooms with its mother school DFLOMNHS located at National Highway, San Blas, Bangar, La Union. Then in July 1998 RSHS moved to its present site at Ma. Cristina East, Bangar, La Union. The RSHS-1 campus was donated by the Municipal Government of Bangar.

Panorama

Milestones

Admission
Admission to any RSHS is a three-step screening given to all qualified elementary students. To be eligible for admission, applicants must be Filipino students who belong to the top 10% of the graduating class and must have special aptitude in science and math. The screening includes two examinations and one interview.

Curriculum

Student Opportunities

Research
Students are provided with original research opportunities in the biological, physical, and social sciences, as well as in field of mathematics and programs that hone students' investigation skills and prepare for academic competitions.

Publications
 The RSHS Catalyst- the official English publication of RSHS.
 Ang Tagatuklas (The Explorer)- official Filipino publication.

Facilities and resources
The RSHS for Region 1 campus contains three buildings: the old academic building, a laboratory building, and the administrative building. The academic building houses all the lecture classes of the students and ICT laboratory. The laboratory building houses science laboratories. The Administrative building houses the Office of the Principal, Faculty Office, and School Library.

Located beside the Administrative building, the laboratory building houses the four laboratories: the General Science Laboratory, the Biology Laboratory, the Chemistry Laboratory and the Physics Laboratory.

The RSHS Library supports the students by providing resources ranging from traditional print and microform to electronic subscription e-journals and databases. Located on the administrative building, the library is composed of the General Library, which stores encyclopedias; the Natural Science Section which covers sciences, mathematics and ICT; the Human Sciences Library which covers history, languages and literature, and other fields of social sciences; and the Multi-media and Internet Library.

The school has also one covered court where sports activities and other productions are held. Construction of the facility began in 2001 as part of the project of the 5th batch of SCIons (class 2002).

Performance

NSAT and NAT and other examinations

Regional Science High School for Region 1 is one of the top high schools in the National Secondary Assessment Test (NSAT) and National Achievement Test (NAT). Likewise it also maintains a high passing rate in college entrance examinations from top caliber universities in the Philippines, such as: University of the Philippines College Admission Test (UPCAT), Ateneo de Manila University College Entrance Test (ACET), De La Salle University College Entrance Test (DLSU-CET), University of Santo Tomas College Entrance Test (UST-CET) and Saint Louis University- Baguio City College Entrance Examination (SLU-CEE). RSHS-1 seniors also showed good passing rate in the Department of Science and Technology Scholarship Examinations.

Competitions
National competitions
National Intel Philippine Science Fair
Philippine Super Quiz bee Science
DAMATHS Olympiad
National School Press Conference
International competitions
 Delegate to the SEAMEO Search for Young Scientists, Penang, Malaysia-July 5–9, 1999
Delegate to the 53rd Intel International Science and Engineering Fair, Kentucky, USA – May 12–18, 2002
Delegate to the Future Creation Fair, JIII, Tokyo, Japan-August 26–31, 2004

Alumni
RSHS-1 alumni are called "SCIons" from the word "Scio" (Latin) word which means science, knowledge and to know; "ions" which implies their importance to society; and the word itself "scion" which denotes descendant of Galileo Galilei, the Father of Modern Science.

Roughly one percent (1%) of alumni are in the sciences, engineering, and mathematics. The rest are in the humanities, journalism, law, business administration, accountancy, medicine, public administration, and the military.

List of Regional Science High Schools (RSHS)

External links

Gusa Regional Science High School
Dropout's imagination is fired by 'kalan'

References

Regional Science High School Union
Science high schools in the Philippines
Schools in La Union
Educational institutions established in 1994
1994 establishments in the Philippines